Gente de Primera is a Spanish television singing competition on TVE where aspiring popstars compete for a record deal, each backed by a popular popstar as a mentor. The first series in 2005 was won by Yanira Figueroa who was backed by Rosa López, and the runner-up was Verónica Rojas, backed by Bertín Osborne. The second series was won by Nauzet who was backed by Natalia, while the runner-up was Mirela who was backed by Pastora Soler. Other popular singers who participated as mentors in the show were Chenoa or Marta Sánchez, among others.

Spanish reality television series
RTVE shows